Kuala Langat may refer to:
Kuala Langat District
Kuala Langat (federal constituency), represented in the Dewan Rakyat 
Kuala Langat (state constituency), formerly represented in the Selangor State Council (1955–59)